The 2020 Hawaii Senate elections took place as part of the biennial 2020 United States elections. Hawaii voters will elect state senators in 13 of the state's 25 senate districts. The primary elections on August 8, 2020, determined which candidates will appear on the November 3, 2020, general election ballot.

Following the previous election in 2018, Democrats had control of the Hawaii Senate with 24 seats to Republicans' 1 seat.

Predictions

Composition

Summary

Retiring incumbents
Two incumbent senators (both Democrats) did not seek reelection in 2020.

District 2: Russell Ruderman (D)
District 25: Laura Thielen (D)

Detailed results

Source for primary results:
Source for general election results:

District 2
Democratic primary

General election

District 5

District 8
Incumbent Democrat and Senate President Ron Kouchi was automatically reelected without opposition, with no votes recorded.

District 9

District 10
Democratic primary

General election
Incumbent Democrat Les Ihara Jr. was automatically reelected without opposition, with no votes recorded.

District 11
Incumbent Democrat Brian Taniguchi was automatically reelected without opposition, with no votes recorded.

District 13

General election
Incumbent Democrat Karl Rhoads was automatically reelected without opposition, with no votes recorded.

District 14
Incumbent Democrat Donna Mercado Kim was automatically reelected without opposition, with no votes recorded.

District 15
Incumbent Democrat Glenn Wakai was automatically reelected without opposition, with no votes recorded.

District 16 (special)

District 19
Democratic primary

General election

District 20

District 22
Democratic primary

General election

District 25

See also
 2020 Hawaii elections
 2020 United States elections
 Hawaii Senate
 Elections in Hawaii

References

External links
 
 
  (State affiliate of the U.S. League of Women Voters)
 

Senate
Hawaii Senate elections
Hawaii Senate